Dr. Swithun Mombeshora (August 20, 1945 – 19 March 2003) was a former Minister of Transport and Communications and Higher and Tertiary Education in Zimbabwe.

Shortly before his death in 2003, he was placed on the United States sanctions list.

References

2003 deaths
ZANU–PF politicians
Government ministers of Zimbabwe
1945 births